Solveig Zander (born 1955) is a Swedish Centre Party politician. She served as a member of the Riksdag from 2006 to 2020.

References

External links
Solveig Zander at the Riksdag website

Members of the Riksdag from the Centre Party (Sweden)
Living people
1955 births
Women members of the Riksdag
21st-century Swedish women politicians
21st-century Swedish politicians
Members of the Riksdag 2006–2010
Members of the Riksdag 2010–2014
Members of the Riksdag 2014–2018
Members of the Riksdag 2018–2022